Marko Docić (born 21 April 1993) is a Serbian footballer who plays as a midfielder for Čukarički.

References

External links
 
 Marko Docić Stats at utakmica.rs

1993 births
Living people
Footballers from Belgrade
Association football midfielders
Serbian footballers
FK Radnički Obrenovac players
FK Srem Jakovo players
FK Javor Ivanjica players
FK Čukarički players
Serbian First League players
Serbian SuperLiga players